Neoblakea is a genus of flowering plants belonging to the family Rubiaceae.

It is native to Venezuela and Ecuador.
 
The genus name of Neoblakea is in honour of Sidney Fay Blake (1892–1959), an American botanist and plant taxonomist, and it was first described and published in Publ. Field Mus. Nat. Hist., Bot. Series 8, on page 54 in 1930.

Known species
According to Kew:
Neoblakea ecuadorensis 
Neoblakea venezuelensis

References

Rubiaceae
Rubiaceae genera
Plants described in 1845
Flora of Venezuela
Flora of Ecuador